Ranko Zirojević (born 1 September 1967) is a former Montenegrin footballer who played as a midfielder.

Playing career

Club
He played in the juvenile ranks of FK Sutjeska Nikšić and was about to make a transfer toward First League team FK Budućnost Podgorica, but the deal broke. Zirojević stayed at Second League team Sutjeska where his career didn't prosper with the start of the Yugoslav Wars in which he lost a brother. He scored eleven goals in the 1989/90 campaign and three goals in eighteen matches in the 1990/91 season.

In July 1993, Zirojević joined Greek second division side Ethnikos Piraeus F.C. The club was promoted and he made eight appearances in the Greek Superleague (1994/95), before returning to FK Mogren in December 1994. The following season, he joined Slovenian side NK Branik Maribor. He would finish his career with Mogren.

He finished his career playing in Serbia with FK Vrbas in the seasons 1997–98 and 1998–99.

International
Zirojević featured in the Yugoslavia national under-20 football team that won the title at the 1987 FIFA World Youth Championship.

Post playing
He later became the coach of FK Mogren's youth academy.

In 2011, he and former youth worldcup teammate Slaviša Đurković were denied a pension for their sport-achievements by the Montenegrin authorities. He is participating in a UEFA A-license coaching course in 2011.

References

External links

Profile at Prvaliga.si

1967 births
Living people
Association football midfielders
Yugoslav footballers
Serbia and Montenegro footballers
FK Sutjeska Nikšić players
FK Mogren players
Ethnikos Piraeus F.C. players
NK Maribor players
FK Vrbas players
Yugoslav First League players
Yugoslav Second League players
Football League (Greece) players
Super League Greece players
Second League of Serbia and Montenegro players
Slovenian PrvaLiga players
Serbia and Montenegro expatriate footballers
Expatriate footballers in Greece
Serbia and Montenegro expatriate sportspeople in Greece
Expatriate footballers in Slovenia
Serbia and Montenegro expatriate sportspeople in Slovenia